Enjoy may refer to:

Music
Enjoy, an album by Bob Sinclar
Enjoy, a song by Janet Jackson
Enjoy, a song from Björk's album Post
Enjoy Records, an American record label
Enjoy (play), a 1980 comedy play by Alan Bennett
Enjoy! (Descendents album), a 1986 album by American punk rock band The Descendents, or the homonymous song
Enjoy! (Jeanette album), an album by German pop singer Jeanette, or the homonymous song, "Enjoy (Me)"

Other uses
Enjoy (car sharing), an Italian car-sharing service
Enjoy (2021 film), a1 British short film
Enjoy (2022 film),  an Indian Tamil-language romantic comedy film
Barnabas Enjoy (born 1980), Cooks Island footballer

See also
Happiness
Joy
Anand (disambiguation), Sanskrit for happiness